Terminal nucleotidyltransferase 5D is a protein that in humans is encoded by the TENT5D gene.

Function

Antibodies against the protein encoded by this gene were found only in plasma from cancer patients. While it may be a target for immunotherapy, the function of this gene is unknown. [provided by RefSeq, Dec 2009].

References

Further reading